The Handy Board is a popular handheld robotics controller. The Handy Board was developed at MIT by Fred G. Martin, and was closely based on a previous controller designed by Martin and Randy Sargent for the MIT LEGO Robot Contest. The Handy Board design is licensed free of charge. Thus, several manufacturers make Handy Boards. The Handy Board is used by hundreds of schools worldwide and by many hobbyists for their robot projects.

Handy Board specs 
 68HC11 8-bit microcontroller @ 2 MHz
 32KB battery-backed SRAM
 2x16 LCD character display
 Support for four 1A motors
 6 Servo motor controllers
 7 Digital and 9 Analog inputs
 8 Digital and 16 Analog outputs
 Infrared I/O capabilities
 Serial interface capabilities
 Sound output
 11 cm x 8.5 cm x 5.25 cm (lxwxh – with battery, expansion board, and lcd screen)

References

External links 
 Official Handy Board website
 Sourceforge page for UMass Lowell Handy Board Bootloader (George Pantazopoulos, Mike Bohan)
 GNU binutils+gcc port for the m68hc1x

Robotics hardware